The Los Angeles Dodgers underwent a period of turmoil in management in 2011 and 2012 that began when Major League Baseball seized control of the team from owner Frank McCourt on April 20, 2011 and ended when the team was sold to new owners on May 1, 2012.

Baseball Commissioner Bud Selig announced that the takeover was due to concerns over the team's finances, and a loss of confidence in the ability of owner Frank McCourt to run the team. Selig announced his intention to appoint an overseer to supervise the day-to-day financial management of the Dodgers.  In June, as the Dodgers struggled to meet payroll, Selig rejected a television contract that would have pumped money into the organization.  This led to the Dodgers filing for bankruptcy, and being forced to negotiate a loan with MLB to keep the club operating.

After a year of negotiations and court proceedings, the dispute ended with the sale of the team to Guggenheim Baseball Management LLC.

Background 
Frank McCourt and his wife Jamie purchased the Dodgers from the Fox Entertainment Group in 2004. In order to arrange the purchase, he needed a $145 million loan from Fox, for which he used his Boston parking lots as collateral. Fox eventually foreclosed on the parking lot property and sold it.

Under McCourt's ownership of the Dodgers the team made the playoffs four times, advancing to the NLCS twice.

On October 14, 2009, it was announced the McCourts would be separating after nearly 30 years of marriage. While speculation was raised on the impact upon the McCourt family Dodger ownership, a spokesperson for Jamie McCourt said the following day that "the focus of the Dodgers is on the playoffs and the World Series". Jamie McCourt was fired from her position as Dodgers CEO on Thursday, October 22, 2009, the day after the Dodgers were eliminated from the playoffs, thus ending the reign of the self-proclaimed "First Female CEO of a Baseball Team." She officially filed for divorce shortly thereafter. Frank McCourt then accused her of having an affair with her bodyguard and changed the locks on her office. Frank McCourt claimed at the time that the divorce would have "no bearing on the team whatsoever".

On December 7, 2010 the judge in the divorce case invalidated the post-nuptial marital property agreement ("MPA") that Frank McCourt had claimed provided him with sole ownership of the Dodgers.  In the wake of this decision Frank McCourt's lawyers said that Frank would use other legal avenues to establish his sole ownership of the Dodgers, while Jamie McCourt's lawyers said that Jamie would be confirmed as the co-owner of the team as community property of their marriage.

On March 31, 2011, after the Opening Day game against the San Francisco Giants, a Giants fan was attacked by two men wearing Dodgers attire in the Dodger Stadium parking lot. The fan suffered serious injuries and was diagnosed with brain damage. McCourt was criticized for his response to the incident.  The attack put a damper on attendance at Dodger games, and led to the Dodgers incurring increased expenses in security.

On April 5, 2011, McCourt presented Selig's office with a contract giving Fox broadcasting rights to the team for the next 20 years. The deal is said to be valued at between US$2.5 to US$3 billion.

Fox also provided McCourt with a personal loan of $30 million to cover the Dodgers payroll. To secure the loan, McCourt promised Fox he would pay them back with money from a settlement or judgment against the lawfirm that drafted the invalidated marital agreement. The lawfirm responded to the report by filing a lawsuit against McCourt, seeking a judicial declaration that the firm is not responsible for him losing control of the Dodgers.

Just prior to MLB taking over the Dodgers, TMZ.com reported that the Internal Revenue Service was investigating the McCourts in response to allegations that they had been taking money out of the Dodgers for years without paying taxes.

Bud Selig's statement 
In a statement to the press on April 20, 2011, Commissioner Bud Selig announced that the commissioner's office was effectively seizing control of the Dodgers. 

Reactions to Selig's move have been generally positive. For example, The New York Times baseball journalist Tyler Kepner editorialized that "Bud Selig has never looked better than he does right now." However, ESPN correspondent Gene Wojciechowski criticized Selig and MLB, making the case that Selig and the 29 other MLB owners at the time turned a blind eye to the financial problems that the McCourts were known to have when they purchased the team in 2004.

Frank McCourt's statement 
In a statement to the press on April 20, 2011, owner Frank McCourt responded:

Steve Soboroff, hired by McCourt as the Dodgers vice chairman April 19, 2011, described the takeover of the team's operations as "irresponsible".

Tom Schieffer appointed
On April 25, 2011, Selig appointed Tom Schieffer, former Ambassador to Japan and former President of the Texas Rangers, to oversee the team's finances.  Schieffer had veto power over any team expenditure over $5,000.

Divorce settlement and rejection of TV deal

In June, the cash-strapped McCourt struggled to meet payroll, only meeting it with help from some of his friends. As the Dodgers' end-of-June payroll, which included over $8 million in deferred payments to former Dodger Manny Ramirez, neared, it was reported that McCourt would be unable to meet payroll without the approval of a 17-year, $3 billion television deal with Fox Sports Net. However, on June 20, MLB commissioner Bud Selig declined to approve the deal.  Selig's action also voided a settlement reached on June 17 between Frank and Jamie that divided their assets apart from the Dodgers.

On August 4, a one-day trial was scheduled to decide whether the Dodgers was community property of Frank and Jamie McCourt or the property of Frank alone.  However, the trial was canceled when the Dodgers filed for bankruptcy.

Later, the court agreed to a 30- to 45-day trial to settle the divorce, and decide who owned the Dodgers. The trial was expected to start in spring or summer of 2012. In the meantime they agreed to sell some of their residential holdings. On October 17, 2011 it was announced that the McCourts had reached a settlement in their divorce case, in which Jamie would give up her claims on the Dodgers and Frank would pay her about $130 million. The divorce is believed to have been the costliest in California history.

Bankruptcy Court
On June 27, the Dodgers filed for Chapter 11 bankruptcy protection.

In the filing,  the Dodgers sought permission to use a $150 million loan from a hedge fund for daily operations, according to a team news release. If approved, this would allow the team to meet its payroll obligations to Ramirez, Andruw Jones, and others.
  After the filing, the Dodgers told Tom Schieffer that he no longer had any authority in relation to the Dodgers and refused to let him return to work. MLB filed their own response to the bankruptcy filing, in which they said that the court should reject McCourt's bid to save his ownership by "threatening the immediate demise of one of baseball's great teams." They also asked the court to consider if McCourt should remain the owner during the proceedings and if Schieffer can remain in his position.

In the court hearing on June 28, the Dodgers and MLB agreed that the Dodgers could use the hedge fund financing temporarily, pending a July 20 hearing on MLB's request to take over funding of the Dodgers. The language in McCourt's original filing asking for an auction of the television rights was deleted temporarily, though that could come up again in the next hearing.

As part of the bankruptcy proceedings, McCourt's lawyer served Selig and other top MLB executives with subpoenas, in an attempt to prove that Selig had predetermined that he was going to seize the Dodgers. MLB attorneys responded that allowing McCourt access to MLB documents and executives would turn the hearing into  "a multi-ringed side show of mini-trials on his personal disputes." The Judge sided with MLB and ruled that McCourt could not compel the release of the documents or depose Selig because they weren't relevant to the issue of the bankruptcy.

After a hearing on July 20, the judge rejected McCourt's further use of the Highbridge loan and ordered McCourt to negotiate a loan with MLB.

On September 23, the MLB made several requests of the court, to be decided at an October 12 hearing.  It asked that the judge order the Dodgers seized and sold.  It also threatened to block any attempt to sell TV rights (and perhaps even suspend the team from the league for the 2012 season), and alleged that McCourt's lawyers have no standing as he and they are in violation of MLB rules. The Dodgers in a statement said that MLB was trying to force "an unnecessary and value-destroying distressed sale"  of the team.

On September 30, Judge Gross ruled that McCourt's lawyers could not attempt discovery by looking into the records of other MLB clubs.  However, he did say he expected Selig to testify in person.  He set the hearing for the MLB and McCourt's lawyers to provide case for and against the sale of the club in early November, where he would rule on various points involving McCourt, the Dodgers, MLB, and the TV contract.

Sale of the Dodgers
On November 1, 2011 McCourt and MLB issued a joint statement that McCourt had agreed to sell the team, the Stadium and the parking lots. The league hoped to have a new owner in place by opening day, 2012.

Opening bids on the team were due on January 24, 2012. Several groups of potential owners placed bids on the Dodgers, groups known to have placed bids include:
Magic Johnson, Guggenheim Partners and Stan Kasten
 Hedge fund executive Steven A. Cohen & Arn Tellem
 Developer Rick J. Caruso and former Dodgers manager Joe Torre
Stanley Gold
Dennis Gilbert and Larry King
Dallas Mavericks owner Mark Cuban
Former Dodger players  Orel Hershiser & Steve Garvey
Former Dodgers owner Peter O'Malley and South Korean conglomerate E-Land
Former Dodgers GM Fred Claire
Jared Kushner
Michael Heisley
Josh Macciello
After the initial round of bidding, the groups backed by Hershiser & Garvey, Claire, Gilbert & King and Mark Cuban did not advance to the next round, where the remaining bidders were  vetted by MLB.

On March 27, 2012, it was announced that an agreement had been reached on the sale of the Dodgers between Frank McCourt and Guggenheim Baseball Management LLC, a group of investors fronted by Guggenheim CEO Mark Walter and including former Los Angeles Lakers player Magic Johnson, baseball executive Stan Kasten and film mogul Peter Guber.

The total sale price for the Dodgers (which includes Dodger Stadium and surrounding land) exceeded $2 billion, making the sale the largest for a professional sports team in history, exceeding the approximately $1.5 billion purchase of Manchester United F.C. by Malcolm Glazer in 2005.

The sale price of the Dodgers was considered to be far higher than what the team was actually worth at the time of sale. Estimates made by Forbes placed the value of the Dodgers at approximately $1.4 billion, and the winning bid was more than 30% higher than the next highest bid.

On April 13, the sale was approved by the bankruptcy court and on May 1, 2012 the sale officially closed.

References 

Los Angeles Dodgers
Los Angeles Dodgers ownership dispute
Los Angeles Dodgers ownership dispute
Los Angeles Dodgers ownership
Major League Baseball controversies